Raimund Berens is a film producer of German origin. He is based in London, United Kingdom and is Co-Founder / Producer at Ostara Pictures. Graduating from the London Film School in 2005, Berens joined Focus Films as a runner, and later became Head of Production. After co- & executive producing three features, he joined Iron Box Films in early 2010, serving as CEO from 2013-2020. There he produced the company's first feature film Betsy & Leonard; the film won several awards including Best Feature and Best Film at the 2013 Tenerife International Film Festival.

Films
Siege on Liperti Street 2019 (directed by Stavros Pamballis and featuring Daphne Alexander and Konstantinos Markoulakis)
Ravers 2012 (directed by Bernhard Pucher and featuring Georgia Hirst and Natasha Henstridge)
Betsy & Leonard 2012 (directed by Bernhard Pucher and featuring Ryan Davenport (actor) and Sharea Samuels)
Master Harold...and the Boys 2008 (directed by Lonny Price and featuring Ving Rhames and Freddie Highmore)
Surviving Evil 2008 (directed by Terence Daw and features Billy Zane, Christina Cole and Natalie Mendoza)
 Chemical Wedding 2007 (directed by Julian Doyle and starring Simon Callow, Kal Webber, Jud Charlton and Lucy Cudden)

References

Sources
Screendaily Article on Iron Box Films
Hollywood Reporter Article on Iron Box Films

External links
Company Website

Living people
British film producers
Year of birth missing (living people)
Alumni of the London Film School
German emigrants to the United Kingdom
People from Wesel